Swimming at the 2015 Indian Ocean Island Games was held at Piscine Michel Debré, Saint-Denis, Réunion.

Medalist

Men

Women

External links
 Official website

2015 Indian Ocean Island Games events
Swimming at the Indian Ocean Island Games
Indian Ocean Island